Tamón is one of 12 parishes (administrative divisions) in Carreño, a municipality within the province and autonomous community of Asturias, in northern Spain.

The postal code is 33469.

Villages
The villages and hamlets include: Alredor de la Ilesia, Bardiel, Les Cabañes, La Calle la Vega, El Cascayu, Cotones, La Fontanina, La Güelga, Maripullín, El Monte Grande, El Monte'l Pando, El Redal, El Rioncéu, Samartín, Tabaza, La Tabla, Les Tranques, La Velilla, La Vera'l Ríu, La Venta, Villar de Baxo, Villar de Riba and Villa Flor.

Parishes in Carreño